A component speaker is a car audio speaker matched for optimal sound quality. Typically a pair of tweeters and  mid-bass drivers are matched with a crossover to limit the frequency range each speaker must accurately reproduce. Component speakers drivers are physically separated so the tweeter, which is very directional, can be placed in an optimal position, usually on the dash facing the listener, while the larger mid-bass driver can be placed where there is room, often in the lower front of the car doors. Component speaker pairs are offered by all of the high-end audio manufacturers.

Best component speakers enhance your car sound quality because of separate orientation of all speakers tweeters, mid-bass and base or base tube. A crossover or a amplifier is used to channelize the audio all over the car.

Loudspeakers